Ursula Karven, previously Ursula Karven-Veres (born Ursula Ganzenmüller 17 September 1964 in Ulm) is a German actress, writer, model and yoga instructor.

In June 2001 her four-year-old son, Daniel, drowned at a birthday party in the swimming pool of American musician Tommy Lee in Malibu.

Career 
Karven made her big screen debut in 1984, at age 20, with the participation in film Ein irres Feeling, directed by Nikolai Müllerschön.

In 1986, she appeared for the first time on television in an episode of the thirteenth season of the television series Derrick, titled "The Eyewitness" (Der Augenzeuge). In 1989 she played in the  television series Rivalen der Rennbahn, in which she plays the role of Jeannette.

In 1994 she participated in the television series Elbflorenz, in which she plays the role of Katja Böhling.

The following year she returned to cinema and was devoted to films such as criminal Impact. Later, in 2006, she was the star of the television series M.E.T.R.O. – Ein Team auf Leben und Tod, where she played the role of Katharina Hansen.

In 2012, at age 47, she posed for the cover of Playboy magazine.

The following year she starred in the TV movie Nicht mit mir, Liebling. In the film, directed by Thomas Nennstiel, the actress plays the role of Nina von der Heyden.

Personal life 
Ursula Ganzenmüller, later known by the stage name of Ursula Karven, was born in Ulm, Baden-Württemberg, on 17 September 1964. 
Ursula Karven lived with her family for a few years in Florida, United States, and later lived on the island of Majorca, Spain.

She was married to James Veres and had three sons, Christopher (b. 1994) Daniel (b. 1997) and Liam Taj (b. 2003).

In June 2001 4-year-old Daniel Karven-Veres,  drowned while attending a party at Mötley Crüe's drummer, Tommy Lee's, Malibu mansion in 2001. Karven and Veres sued Lee for $10 million, however a jury found Lee not guilty.

Karven began practicing yoga when she was 30, and has published several books and DVDs promoting and demonstrating yoga-based exercises.

As well as acting, Karven markets her own line of baby products and a maternity clothing range called "Bellybutton". In 2010 she moved from Mallorca to Berlin.

Filmography 

 1982: 
 1984: Ein irres Feeling
 1986–1992: Derrick (TV series, 3 episodes)
 1988: Beule
 1989: Rivalen der Rennbahn (TV series, 2 episodes)
 1989–1990: Das Erbe der Guldenburgs (TV series, 5 episodes)
 1990:  (TV series, 7 episodes)
 1990:  (TV series)
 1990: Fire, Ice and Dynamite
 1990: Extralarge (Episode: Moving Target)
 1994: Elbflorenz (TV series)
 1996: Hart to Hart: Harts in High Season (TV film)
 1996: Tatort: Bei Auftritt Mord
 1998: Rosamunde Pilcher (TV series, episode: Dornen im Tal der Blumen)
 1998: Ich schenk dir meinen Mann
 1999: Liebe ist stärker als der Tod
 2000: Feindliche Schwestern – Wenn aus Liebe Hass wird
 2000: Autsch, du Fröhliche
 2001:  (TV series, episode: Unsichtbare Gegner)
 2001: Holiday Affair
 2001: Balko (TV series, episode: Für ein paar Dollar mehr)
 2001: Der Club der grünen Witwen
 2002: Vater braucht eine Frau
 2002: Con Express
 2002: Familie XXL
 2003: Before I Say Goodbye
 2003: Denninger – Der Mallorcakrimi (Episode: Doppeltes Spiel)
 2004: Die Kommissarin (TV series, episode: Schwarze Lieben, roter Tod)
 2005: Ein Fall für zwei (TV series, episode: Juwelen)
 2005: Tote leben länger
 2005–2008: Tatort (TV series, 6 episodes)
 2006: M.E.T.R.O. – Ein Team auf Leben und Tod (TV series, 10 episodes)
 2008: Ein starkes Team (TV series, episode: Freundinnen)
 2008: Stille Post
 2009: 
 2010: Der letzte Patriarch
 2011: Mein Herz in Malaysia
 2012: Nicht mit mir, Liebling
 2012: Mein Herz in Malaysia
 2012: Stuttgart Homicide (TV series, episode: Um Haaresbreite)
 2013: Hattinger und die kalte Hand – Ein Chiemseekrimi
 2013: Wer liebt, lässt los
 2013: Eine unbeliebte Frau
 2014: 
 2014: Der Weg nach San Jose
 2015: Katie Fforde: A Christmas Miracle in New York
 2016: Katie Fforde: Why Did I Say Yes?

Bibliography 
 2003: Yoga für die Seele 
 2005: Sina und die Yogakatze
 2006: Das große Babybuch
 2006: Das große Schwangerschaftsbuch
 2007: Sinas Yogakatze und der singende Weihnachtsbaum 
 2007: Yoga für Dich
 2007: yoga für dich und überall, Gräfe und Unzer, München; 1. Auflage 2007, 
 2009: Yoga del Mar – Power Yoga II
 2011: Mein Kochbuch für Kochmuffel
 2013: Loslassen Yoga-Weisheiten für dich und überall

See also 
 Con Express

References

External links 

 Ursula Karven - Official Website 

1964 births
Living people
People from Ulm
German film actresses
German television actresses
20th-century German actresses
21st-century German actresses
German female models
German women writers